Sabina may refer to:

Places and jurisdictions 
 Sabina (region), region and place in Italy, and hence:
 the now Suburbicarian Diocese of Sabina (-Poggio Mirteto), Italy
 Magliano Sabina, city, Italy
 Pozzaglia Sabina, city, Italy
Fara Sabina, a commune in the Province of Rieti, Lazio, Italy
Palombara Sabina, a town and commune in the province of Rome, Italy
Sabinas Hidalgo, a municipality in Nuevo León, Mexico
Sabinas, Coahuila, a municipality in Mexico
Sabina, Illinois, unincorporated community, United States
Sabina, Ohio, village, United States
Sabina Park, Kingston, Jamaica
Šabina, region in the Sokolov District, Czech Republic
Al-Sabinah, a town in Rif Dimashq governorate, Syria

People

Antiquity 
 Poppaea Sabina (30–65), wife of the emperor Nero
 Vibia Sabina (83–136/137), wife of the emperor Hadrian, posthumously deified as diva Sabina
 Saint Sabina, dedicatee of the basilica of Santa Sabina

Given name 
Sabina (judge), Indian high court judge
Sabina Aufenwerth (1706–1782), German potter
Sabina Babayeva (born 1979), Azerbaijani singer 
Sabina Wanjiru Chege (born 1972), Kenyan politician
Sabina Citron (born 1928), Holocaust survivor, activist, and author
Sabina Classen (born 1963), German thrash metal singer
Sabina Cojocar (born 1985), Romanian gymnast
Sabina Eriksson (born 1967), Swedish murderer accused of manslaughter in Britain
Sabina Fluxà (born 1980), Spanish businesswoman
Sabina-Francesca Foisor (born 1989), Romanian chess player
Sabina Glasovac (born 1978), Croatian politician
Sabina Guzzanti (born 1963), Italian satirist, actress, writer, and producer
Sabina Higgins, wife of Michael D. Higgins, President of Ireland
Sabina Khasayeva (born 1993), Azerbaijani politician
Sabina Măriuţă (born 1995), Romanian figure skater
Sabina West Miller (1867–1954), American businesswoman
Sabina Moya (born 1977), Colombian javelin thrower
Sabina Sciubba (born 1975), German-Italian singer and front woman of the band Brazilian Girls
Sabina Selimovic, one of two teenage Austrian nationals who went missing in 2014
Sabina Spielrein (1885–1942), Russian psychoanalyst
Sabina Wojtala (born 1981), Polish figure skater
Sabina Yasmin (born 1953), Bangladeshi singer
Sabina Zimering (1923–2021), Polish-American ophthalmologist and memoirist

Surname 
 Joaquín Sabina (born 1949), Spanish singer, songwriter, and poet
 Karel Sabina (1813–1877), Czech writer
 María Sabina (1894–1985), Mexican (Mazatec) curandera

Other uses 
 Sabina (play), 1998 play by Snoo Wilson
 Sabina (film), 1963 film starring Gina Pareño
 Sabina, a character in the 1942 play The Skin of Our Teeth by Thornton Wilder
 Juniperus sabina (Savin Juniper)
 Saniba sabina, of the butterfly genus Saniba
 Sabina, a character in the 2010 film We Are What We Are
 Sabina, a character in the 1984 novel The Unbearable Lightness of Being
 Sabina Wilson, a character in the 2019 film Charlie's Angels

See also 
 Roman Catholic Suburbicarian Diocese of Sabina-Poggio Mirteto
 Sabine (disambiguation)
 Sabrina (disambiguation)
 Santa Sabina (disambiguation)

Romanian feminine given names
Czech feminine given names
Azerbaijani feminine given names
Polish feminine given names